The 2001–02 Omani League was the 26th edition of the top football league in Oman. Dhofar S.C.S.C. were the defending champions, having won the previous 2000–01 Omani League season. Al-Oruba SC emerged as the champions of the 2001–02 Omani League with a total of 22 points.

Teams
This season the league had increased from 10 teams. Ruwi Club and Bawshar Club were relegated to the Second Division League after finishing in the relegation zone in the 2000–01 season. The two relegated teams were replaced Second Division League teams Sidab Club and Al-Khaboura SC.

Stadia and locations

League table

Top level Omani football league seasons
1
Oman